The Chinese Center for Disease Control and Prevention (CCDC) is an institution directly under the National Health Commission, based in Changping District, Beijing, China.

Established in 1983, it works to protect public health and safety by providing information to enhance health decisions, and to promote health through partnerships with provincial health departments and other organizations. The CCDC focuses national attention on developing and applying disease prevention and control (especially infectious diseases), environmental health, occupational safety and health, health promotion, prevention and education activities designed to improve the health of the people of the People's Republic of China.

Operations 
Shen Hongbing is the current Director of Chinese CDC.

The CCDC administers a number of laboratories across China, including the biosafety level 2 facility at the Wuhan Center for Disease Control (sometimes confused with the nearby Wuhan Institute of Virology), which received global media coverage during the COVID-19 pandemic for its research into SARS-like coronaviruses of bat origin.  On January 10, 2020, the CCDC uploaded the genetic sequence of SARS-CoV-2 to GISAID for global dissemination. In 2022, the Center shared with GISAID a phylogenetic analysis of over 32 independent introductions SARS-CoV-2 from outside China that were identified in the first quarter of the year.

The CCDC operates the Chinese Vaccinology Course in partnership with the University of Chinese Academy of Sciences and the Bill & Melinda Gates Foundation.

Workforce 
 the Chinese CDC has 2120 staff with 1876 technical professionals (accounting for 89%), 133 managerial staff (accounting for 6%), and 111 logistic staff (accounting for 5%).

Publications 
The Chinese CDC publishes or co-sponsors a total of 16 journals, including China CDC Weekly, Journal of Hygiene Research, Chinese Journal of Experimental and Clinical Virology, and Chinese Journal of Epidemiology.

See also 
 List of national public health agencies
 Centers for Disease Control and Prevention, US equivalent
 Korea Centers for Disease Control and Prevention, Korean equivalent
 Africa Centres for Disease Control and Prevention, Africa equivalent
 National Bureau of Disease Control and Prevention (established on 13 May 2021)
 World Health Organization
 Wuhan Institute of Virology

References

External links 
 www.chinacdc.cn
 www.chinacdc.cn/en/COVID19

National public health agencies
Government health agencies
Medical and health organizations based in China
Government agencies of China
1983 establishments in China